Mali is a multilingual country. The languages spoken there reflect ancient settlement patterns, migrations, and its long history. Ethnologue counts more than 80 languages. Of these, French is the official language and Bambara is the most widely spoken. All together 13 of the indigenous languages of Mali have the legal status of national language.

Language usage

French, which was introduced during the colonial period, was retained as the official language at independence and is used in government and formal education. Estimates of the number of people who actually speak French are low. Figures estimated in 1986 give a number of 386,000 speakers of French in Mali, derived from the numbers of school attendees. This would mean roughly 21% of the population speak French, by 1986 figures, a number considerably lower than those who speak Bambara. 

Almost all people who speak French in Mali speak it as a second language. 1993 estimates are that there are only around 9,000 Malian speakers of French as a first language. French is more understood in urban centres, with 1976 figures showing a 36.7% "Francophone" rate in urban areas, but only an 8.2% rate in rural areas. French usage is gender weighted as well, with 1984 figures showing 17.5% percent of males speaking French, but only 4.9% of women.

Bambara, a Manding language (in the Mande family) is said to be spoken by 80% of the population as a first or second language. It is spoken mainly in central and Southern Mali. Bambara and two other very closely related Manding languages Malinke or Maninkakan in the southwest and Kassonke (in the region of Kayes in the west), are among the 13 national languages. It is used as a trade language in Mali between language groups.

(Bambara is also very close to the Dyula language ( or), spoken mainly in Côte d'Ivoire and Burkina Faso. The name "Jula" is actually a Manding word meaning "trader.") 

Other Mande languages (not in the Manding group) include Soninke (in the region of Kayes in western Mali) and the Bozo languages (along the middle Niger).

Other languages include Senufo in the Sikasso region (south), Fula as a widespread trade language in the Mopti region and beyond, the Songhay languages along the Niger, the Dogon languages of Pays Dogon or “Dogon country” in central Mali, Tamasheq in the eastern part of Mali's Sahara and Arabic in its western part. 

Thirteen of the most widely spoken indigenous languages are considered "national languages." 

Most formal education for the deaf in Mali uses American Sign Language, introduced to West Africa by the deaf American missionary Andrew Foster. There are two other sign languages in Mali. One, Tebul Sign Language, is found in a village with a high incidence of congenital deafness. Another, Bamako Sign Language, developed in the after-work tea circles of the cities; it is threatened by the educational use of ASL.

Language descriptions 
Most of the languages of Mali are among the Mande languages, which is generally accepted as a branch of Niger–Congo, Africa's largest language family. Non-Mande languages include the Dogon languages, perhaps another Niger–Congo branch, and the Senufo languages, which are unquestionably part of that family. 

Mande, Senufo, and Dogon stand out among Niger–Congo because of their divergent SOV basic word order. The Gur languages are represented by Bomu on the Bani River of Mali and Burkina Faso. Fulfulde, spoken throughout West Africa, is a member of the Senegambian branch.

Other language families include Afro-Asiatic, represented by the Berber language Tamasheq and by Arabic, and the Songhay languages, which have traditionally been classified as Nilo-Saharan but may constitute an independent language family.

Spoken languages 

The following table gives a summary of the 63 spoken languages reported by Ethnologue (there are also 3 sign languages):
Mali Population:
 21.9 million

 * First language / mother tongue speakers. Figures from Ethnologue.
 ** Second or additional language speakers. It is difficult to get accurate figures for this category.

Language Policies & Planning

General
French is the official language. According to the Loi 96-049 of 1996 thirteen indigenous languages are recognised by the government as national languages: Bamanankan, Bomu, Bozo, Dɔgɔsɔ, Fulfulde, Hassaniya Arabic, Mamara, Maninkakan, Soninke, Soŋoy, Syenara, Tamasheq, Xaasongaxanŋo. This superseded the Decree 159 PG-RM of 19 July 1982 (Article 1).

Education
French is part of the standard school curriculum. There is a new policy to use Malian languages in the first grades and transition to French. Activists are also teaching literacy to speakers of Manding languages (Bambara, Malinke, Maninkakan, Dyula) in the standardized N'Ko form.

References

Ethnologue listing for Mali
PanAfrican L10n page on Mali
Linguistic situation in Mali